Harry Earnshaw may refer to:
 Harry Earnshaw (cyclist)
 Harry Earnshaw (trade unionist)